Józef Pyrz, known in France as Joseph Pyrz (equally under the pseudonym Jonasz), born 17 February 1946 in Gawłówek (Poland), is a Polish sculptor, poet and philosopher who lived in France from 1979 until his death. Also known as the "Prophet" ("Prorok"), Joseph Pyrz was the co-founder and legendary leader of the hippie movement in Poland at the turn of the 1960s and 1970s. He died on 24 Sept 2016 in Gawłówek, Poland.

At the age of four he fell ill with tuberculosis, for four years he stayed at the Children's Tuberculosis Sanatorium in Istebna, then at the Tuberculosis Sanatorium in Zakopane, where he graduated from primary school. For a year he studied at the State Secondary School of Fine Arts in Zakopane, then at the State Secondary School of Fine Arts in Kielce, which he graduated in 1965, in the sculpture class. From 1965 he was a student of the Faculty of Christian Philosophy at the Academy of Catholic Theology in Warsaw. During his studies, he became interested in the American hippie movement, gathered around him a group of people who shared hippie ideals and became its leader. In the hippie environment, he was considered a role model and a person privy to the principles and customs of this culture. He was the creator of the manifesto of Polish hippies entitled 'How to become free?', as well as the creator of the first hippie communes in Warsaw's Mokotów and Ożarów Mazowiecki. He was repressed by the communist authorities, including being arrested twice for several months.

In the late 1970s, he emigrated to France and settled in Paris, where he worked as a sculptor. Creator of over 200 works, many are permanently exhibited in major European cathedrals including the Basilca of the Sacré-Cœur in Paris, Częstochowa Cathedral in Poland, and Durham Cathedral and Chester Cathedral in the United Kingdom. His sculptures include a representation of Saint Rita at the Basilica of Sacré Coeur de Montmartre, a monument in the honour of the composer Olivier Messiaen in Vouzeron, the Annunciation in the Galilee Chapel at Durham Cathedral (United Kingdom), and a carving of St. Werburgh in the Lady Chapel at Chester cathedral, formerly the abbey church of a Benedictine monastery dedicated to Saint Werburgh. During 1988, he had a travelling exhibition in Portsmouth, Salisbury, Worcester and the Cranshaw Gallery. A large number of his works are permanently exhibited at the Centre d'art de Schorbach and also at the Spiritual Centre of the Pomarède.

Joseph Pyrz characterised his art with a profound Christian reflection working constantly with the catholic faith, created a unique style linking his artistic work with a spiritual reflection which accompanied him all his life. All of his works represent his philosophical and spiritual search.

A selection of works of Joseph Pyrz and their locations include:
 Sainte Famille I, Foyer de Charité de Marthe Robin, Chatel Saint Denis, (Switzerland);
 Sainte Famille II, école Primaire Jeanne d’Arc, Castelnaudary (Aude);
 Résurrection du Christ, Monastère d’Action de Grâce, Castelnaudary;
 Sainte Claire et Saint François, Monastère d’Action de Grâce, Castelnaudary;
 Annonciation I, Abbaye Saint-Pierre, Champagne s/Rhône (Ardèche);
 Immaculée Conception I, Missionnaire du Sacré Cœur, Chatel Saint-Denis – Villa Vandel (Switzerland);
 Saint François d’Assise commandé par Olivier MESSIAEN pour son Opéra "Saint François d'Assise", École de Musique de Vierzon (Cher);
 Immaculée Conception II, Lycée Saint-Louis-de-Gonzague – Paris XVIe;
 Ave Maria II, église Notre Dame de Vierzon (Cher);
 Passion selon Saint Jean, Caïn et Abel « Pardon », Enfance de Marie, Diocese of Angers, Angers;
  Ave Maria III, Église – Centre Culturel, Lac de Maine (Angers);
 Prière pour la liberté Lirac (Angers), Église paroissiale;
 Sainte-Thérèse, Église Notre Dame de la Gare, Paris XIII;
 Épi de blé, Notre Dame de la Gare, Paris XIII;
 Notre Dame du Silence, École Notre Dame de la Gare, Paris XIII ;
 Saint Casimir et Sainte Edwige (pierre reconstituée), Façade de la maison Saint Casimir, rue du Chevaleret, Paris XIII, ;
 Prière de Moïse, Église Saint Mérri, Paris IV;
 Exode, Église Saint Martin, Barentin, (Rouen);
 Sainte Rita (en pierre), Paris Basilique du Sacré Cœur de Montmartre;
 Annunciation II, Durham Cathedral(United Kingdom);
 Saint Werburgh, Chester Cathedral (United Kingdom);
 Descente de la Croix, Église Saint François de Salles, Paris XVII;
 Christ de Nançay, Nançay (Cher);
 Moïse – Exode – Abbaye de la Grande Trappe, Soligny (Orne);
 Semeur, Église de châvot (Champagne);
 Moulin à bras, Italie collection Barilla;
 Christ-Sermon sur la montagne, Sainte Famille IV, L’Homme Moderne, Collection Malma, Malbork(Poland), ;
 Archange Michel, Eglise Saint Michel, Malbork;
 Les Douze Apôtres, Czestochowa Cathedral (Poland);
 Olivier MESSIAEN (en pierre), Place de l’église, Neuvy sur Barangeon;
 Arbre de Vie Vierge à l’enfant, Notre Dame de l’accueil, Autel et bas relief (en pierre), Communauté de la Pomarède, Paulhenc;
 Christ et Saint Jean-Baptiste (en pierre), Don de l’artiste à l’église de Mikluszowice (Poland);
 St Joseph (bois), Basilique Notre Dame du Perpétuel Secours, Paris XIe;
 Annonciation IV, Les Foyers de Charité, Roche d’Or (Besançon);
 Trinité, Les Foyers de Charité, Roche d’Or (Besançon);
 St Joseph (au sommeil), l’église Notre Dame de l’Arche de l’Alliance, Paris XVe;
 Buisson Ardent (en pierre), Schorbach
 Rencontre, Schorbach;
 Crêche, église Collégiale d’Amboise.

References 

1946 births
Living people